Odintsovka is a rural locality (a selo) in Rossoshanskoye Rural Settlement, Repyovsky District, Voronezh Oblast, Russia. The population was 340 as of 2010. There are 4 streets.

Geography 
Odintsovka is located 18 km northwest of Repyovka (the district's administrative centre) by road. Vladimirovka is the nearest rural locality.

References 

Rural localities in Repyovsky District